Dharmendra Sewan (Nepali: धर्मेन्द्र परियार (सेवान)) is a Nepali singer, songwriter, composer and performer. He released his debut single "Yo Andheri Raat" in 2002. Sewan was also involved in Melancholy, an environmental song by 365 artists, written, composed and directed by environmentalist Nipesh Dhaka in which the song has been featured in Guinness World Records entitled "Most Vocal Solos in a Song Recording" , recorded on 19 May 2016 at Radio Nepal studio.



Musical career 
He started his career a band called Damage Glitters. Later he had a solo career as a singer in venued in Lakeside, Pokhara.
Sewan auditioned for season 1 of Nepali Tara by singing "Aba Chotharule Piroldaina Malai" from the movie 'Allare'. He ended up as a first runner-up in 2005 behind winner Deepak Limbu.

He recorded his first song 'Yo Andheri Raat' in 2002. His famous songs are Yo Andheri Raat, Herda Ramro Machhapuchhre, Ranga Ranga, Joripari, Dherai Nai, Pahadama Hurkeki, Ek Mitho Muskaan, Timro Tyo Rupley, Ful Samjhi and many more. He has won numerous awards from his time of singing and has been an inspiration for most of the youth singers of Nepal. His new released song is Kata Hideki. His albums released so far is 'The 2nd', 'Mero Idol' which consists of songs like Joripari, Dherai Nai, Papi Nazar, and his third album is 'Rastra ko Geet' from which he won 18TH ANNUAL IMAGE AWARD on the category of "Best song with national feelings 2073 by the song 'Aba Uthau'. He has also been a playback singer in many feature films like Raghubir, Ilaka, Kanchhi, Jhyanakuti, Yatra, Kina Kina, Love Love Love, Chapali Height 2, Karkhana, 3 Lovers, Safar, and many more. He did a cover of his father's song 'Herda Ramro Machhapuchre' which won HITS FM MUSIC AWARD in the category of Best Vocal Performance Pop Male in 2014.

Awards

References

1982 births
Living people
Nepalese singer-songwriters
People from Pokhara